Krasny is a Russian language surname from the Russian word for "red, beautiful". Notable people with the name include:
 Alec Brook-Krasny (1958), American former politician
 Dmitry Krasny (died 1440), Russian nobleman
 Elke Krasny (1965), Austrian writer
 Michael Krasny (talk show host) (1944), American journalist, host of the radio talk show Forum
 Michael Krasny (businessman) (1952/1953), American businessman, founder of CDW
 Paul Krasny (1935–2001), American film and television director
 Robert Krasny, American physicist
 Sasha Krasny (1882–1995), pen-name of Aleksandr Davydovich Bryansky
 Yuri Krasny (1946), Russian educator

References 

Russian-language surnames
Surnames from nicknames